Orphanostigma vibiusalis is a moth in the family Crambidae. It was described by Francis Walker in 1859. It is found in the Democratic Republic of the Congo (Katanga, Equateur, North Kivu), southern India, Malaysia and Myanmar.

References

Moths described in 1859
Spilomelinae